Sorn (meaning a kiln) is a small village in East Ayrshire, Scotland.  It is situated on the River Ayr. It has a population of roughly 350. Its neighbouring village is Catrine. Sorn Castle lies just outside the village.

History
Sorn was a parish in Ayrshire. One gazetteer states "It is bounded on the north by Galston; on the east by Muirkirk; on the south by Auchinleck; and on the west by Mauchline." Another states that Sorn did not exist until 1658 when it was disjoined from the parish of Mauchline.

Sorn has a Covenanter history.

Sorn today
Local services include: a pub (closed 2022), a cafe (closed 2021), a church, a general store (closed 2019), a motorbike shop (closed) and a television shop (closed). There is also a village hall and a bowling green and primary school. In November 2007 the school was threatened with closure by East Ayrshire Council.

Sorn is known for its success in the Britain in Bloom competition. In 2004 it won gold in the "Small Villages" category and has previously won, amongst other awards, the "Highly Commended Certificate" a number of times in the 1980s.

Sorn is situated on the River Ayr Way which opened in 2006 as Scotland's first source to sea long-distance path.

Notable people born in Sorn
 John Campbell of Sorn nonconformist minister.
 Rev Lewis Balfour, minister of Sorn 1806 to 1824.
George William Balfour, physician
Alexander Peden - preacher
Sir John Rankine FRSE - legal author
Very Rev John Rankine, minister and Moderator of the General Assembly in 1883 (father of above)
James Rennie - natural historian, author, and educator
James Seaton, Member of New Zealand's Parliament (1875-1879 and 1881–1882)

See also
Lady's Well, Auchmannoch

References

Citations

Sources

External links
 Video footage of Dalgain Church. 
 Video footage of Holehouse Mill.
 Video footage of Dalgain Lime Works and Haggis Bank lime kiln.

Villages in East Ayrshire